Ancient Roman farmers' almanacs (in Latin, menologia rustica) are a type of Roman calendar providing month-by-month information on conditions and activities pertaining to agriculture. They were displayed as public inscriptions. Menologium Rusticum Colotianum measures 0'654 cm in height, 0'410 cm in width. Examples that survived to the modern era are the Menologium Rusticum Colotianum and the Menologium Rusticum Vallense, both dating to the period 19–65 AD or 36–39 to the end of the 1st century AD. Both were discovered in the 16th century, but the Menologium Vallense has been lost.

Description
The Menologium Rusticum Colotianum was discovered by Angelo Colocci, and is held by the Naples Museum. It appears on a four-sided marble altar base, inscribed in twelve columns. Each column contains:
 a zodiac sign
 month name
 number of days in the month
 date of the Nones
 number of daylight and nighttime hours
 astrological house through which the sun passed
 tutelary deity of the month
 agricultural tasks
 religious holidays that a farmer was expected to observe.

Villas on working estates often displayed mosaics and wall painting depicting seasonal or monthly agricultural activities, in some sense illustrations of the menologia rustica.

Van L. Johnson conjectured that the four-sided form of the menologia preserved an original four-month Roman "year" or festival cycle.

Gallery 
Image gallery of the Menologium Rusticum Colotianum (CIL VI 2305=EDR 143318)

Text
 Attilio Degrassi, Inscriptiones Italiae 13: fasti et elogia. Fasciculus 2: Fasti anni Numani et Iuliani, accedunt ferialia, menologia rustica, parapegmata (Rome: Libreria delle Stato, 1963).

See also
 Roman festivals
 Farmers' Almanac
 Old Farmer's Almanac

References

Roman calendar